Vojo Ćalov (born 29 July 1963) is a Montenegrin football manager and former player.

Playing career

Club
Born in Pljevlja, SR Montenegro, back then still within Yugoslavia, Ćalov started playing at third-level side OFK Titograd. In 1984 they achieved promotion, and Ćalov played with OFK Titograd in the 1984–85 Yugoslav Second League. Next season he moved to a Serbian side FK Bor playing same level, however at the end of the season they ended-up relegated. Ćalov stayed another season with Bor, scoring one goal in their 1986/87 third league campaign. That year Ćalov returned to Montenegro and signed with what was by then the best positioned Montenegrin club in the Yugoslav league system, FK Budućnost Podgorica, known till 1991 as FK Budućnost Titograd. Between 1987 and 1992, Ćalov made 70 games in the Yugoslav First League with Budućnost.

Managerial career
Ćalov had his coaching career closely linked to the one of his compatriot Miodrag Božović, being his right-hand as assistant manager while Božović  coached several clubs in Russia, first FC Amkar Perm in 2008, followed by FC Moscow in 2009, then between July 15, 2013 and September 26, 2014, FC Rostov, from where he left to FC Lokomotiv Moscow. Then, in July 2015, he followed Božović again, this time moving to Serbia to become assistantsp manager at Red Star Belgrade.

References

1963 births
Living people
Sportspeople from Pljevlja
Association football midfielders
Yugoslav footballers
OFK Titograd players
FK Bor players
FK Budućnost Podgorica players
Yugoslav First League players
Yugoslav Second League players
Montenegrin football managers
Expatriate football managers in Russia